WPIG (95.7 FM) is a radio station located in Olean, New York. Branded as "95.7 The Big Pig", the station operates a broad-based country music format.  It is owned by Seven Mountains Media.

History
The station originally signed on as WHDL-FM in 1949 and in its early years was affiliated, like most upstate New York FMs of the time, with WQXR-FM in New York City. James F. Hastings, later a U.S. Congressman, ran the station from 1952 to 1966. The call sign was changed from WHDL-FM to WEBF-FM in recognition of station owner E. Boyd Fitzpatrick. During the 1980s, the station aired what today's jockeys pejoratively referred to as an "elevator music" (likely something along the lines of middle-of-the-road, beautiful music or easy listening) format. In September 1988, under new ownership, the station was known as WOLN (not to be confused with FM 91.3, the public radio station that currently uses the callsign) with an adult contemporary format. A year later, on September 29, 1989, the call sign was changed to WPIG. Later, on November 6, mirroring the national trend, the station switched formats to the rapidly burgeoning country music format and became known as "The Big Pig 95.7, Today's Sizzlin' Country." It has held the same slogan, branding, and format ever since, for 30 years as of 2019; it thus has the longest uninterrupted and active run with the same format in the Southwestern New York region.

WPIG operates under the corporate entity Arrow Communications of New York. The company has variously been held by Sabre Communications, then Backyard Broadcasting, and Community Broadcasters, LLC, who purchased the station in 2013; in January 2019, Community Broadcasters sold its Southern Tier stations to Seven Mountains Media.

During the first several years of the country format, WPIG disc jockeys used pseudonyms with pig-based puns, such as: "Smokey' Joe Bacon," "Michael Hamm," "Peggy Banks," "Sue EE Cinamon Frank "Adam Ribbs," and "Christopher Neggs" (the first incarnation of The Morning Pigpen's hosts were thus bacon, ham, 'n'eggs; see also the Froggy brand, which uses similar frog-based pun names). This idea was dropped in the late 1990s as the second generation of disc jockeys would join the station, all of whom used more conventional names. Neggs remains with the station as a weekend personality and fill-in, now using his real name, Nick Purcio.

The second generation of hosts remained in their positions for over a decade; from 1998 to 2006 and 2008 to 2009, the station's lineup featured the same lineup of disc jockeys. Mark Thompson, the program director and co-host of the morning show, is the last remaining on-air personality from this era; the other three hosts from this era (Casey Hill, Mike "Smitty" Smith and Jesse Garon, all three of whom have either retired from radio and/or left Western New York) went on to launch WGWE shortly after leaving The Pig. This cleared the way for the third, and later fourth, generation of hosts that currently air on the station. WPIG added the slogan "Today's Fun Country" in 2009, which rotates with the "Sizzlin' Country" format. Also added around this time was the Big Pig Jackpot, a contest in which the station announces the amount of money in a progressive jackpot over the course of the day cold-calls random people in the listening area to test if they listen to the station; a person who either knows the answer (or, by chance, guesses correctly) wins the jackpot. The jackpot was dropped in 2014.

The station tweaked its image in 2013 with its sale to Community Broadcasters, adding 30-minute blocks of "continuous country," dropping national news, auto racing coverage and its Saturday night classic country block, taking over the local chapter of the national Country Showdown competition (which had previously rested with WQRS), and changing its voiceover announcer for the first time since adopting the country format. The station began streaming its programming on the Internet for the first time in its history beginning in 2014.

The station's image was once again tweaked in 2019 following the station's purchase by Seven Mountains Media. The on-air playlist (outside syndicated shows) has come to resemble a country version of the adult hits format, airing a gold-based playlist centered around the 1980s, 1990s, 2000s, 2010s, and some current music. For a brief period of time, a handful of country oldies dating as far back as the early 1950's were also included in the mix, although these subsequently have been phased out. Classic performers such as Randy Travis, Mark Chesnutt, Joe Diffie, Alabama, and Clint Black have once again become core artists, mixed in regular rotation with current artists. The station is one of the few country stations in Seven Mountain Media's portfolio not to use the "Bigfoot Country" brand nor share its airstaff with other country stations in the Seven Mountains portfolio; WPIG continues to use the Pig logo, mascot and longstanding air staff out of acknowledgement of the brand's heritage and consistent high listenership in Olean.

Programming

Regular programming
 "The Morning Pigpen" w/ Mark Thompson, Gary Nease, & Michael Hamm (weekdays 6-10am)
 "Lunchlady Katie" McLean (weekdays 10am-3pm), with the classic country programming block "Noon In the 90s" from Noon-1
 "The Afternoon Pigpen" with Michael Hamm (weekdays 3-7pm)
 "Taste of Country Nights" w/ Evan & Amber (weekdays 7pm-Midnight)
 "Backstage Country" (weekdays Midnight-5am)

The Morning Pigpen and the noon classic country block have aired continuously since WPIG adopted the format in 1989.

WPIG also has a local news bureau run by Gary Nease and Michael Hamm, with Nick Pircio reporting. National news is provided by CBS Radio News. Weather is provided by former WSTM-TV chief meteorologist Wayne Mahar, who phones in his live forecast via Zoom each morning.

Sports programming
 WPIG has been the flagship station of the St. Bonaventure Bonnies men's basketball team since at least the 1990s.
 Buffalo Bills Radio Network

Special programming
 WPIG rebrands as "95 Poinsettia" and airs A WPIG Country Christmas, an automated selection of country-themed Christmas music, throughout Christmas Eve through Christmas Day. Between the Friday after Thanksgiving and Christmas Eve, the station generally plays one Christmas song each hour. (Beginning in 2013, the Christmas selections were broadened to include more traditional Christmas songs from the adult standards format in addition to country Christmas covers.)

Discontinued programming and hosts

Syndicated
 Earl Pitts Uhmerikun was dropped by WPIG in 1999.
 ABC FM News aired on the station at the top of each hour until 2013.
 WPIG was "The Twin Tiers' Racin' Station" and carried NASCAR's Winston Cup, Nextel Cup and Sprint Cup circuits through 2013, along with Motor Racing Network's NASCAR USA and Performance Racing Network's Racing Country. All auto racing programming moved to another station in the market for 2014.
 Blair Garner, in the form of either After Midnite or his Nash FM overnight show, was used for overnights throughout Garner's run as a syndicated host until he left Nash FM in 2020.

First generation
 Southern Fried Friday, a local program dedicated to Southern rock, was discontinued sometime after 2000 and replaced by the Foxworthy Countdown.
 "Smokey' Joe Bacon" - Mornings, left ca. 1998
 "Peggy Banks" - Middays, including "Classic Country Café," left ca. 1998
 "Tommy Spurrs" Mid Day Original Southern Fried Friday Host Left ca. 1993
 "Sue EE" Weekend Late Night Left ca. 1991
 Michael Hamm - Morning host in the 1990s, left, then rejoined ca. 2009 as evening host, left again in 2016, then rejoined again in 2021 as morning news anchor
 Gentleman Jim Bradford - Morning Host Early 1990s.

Second generation
 Kerry Monroe (aka Adam Ribbs, 1992-1997, evening host, and host of Southern Fried Friday). As of 2020, currently a fill-in and weekend host upon returning after leaving the station for a short time.
Casey Hill, sporadic co-host of the Morning Pigpen (c.1999-2006, 2008–2009). Currently semi-retired.
Mindy Cunningham, former co-host of the Morning Pigpen and later host of Midday Mayhem show (2006–2008). Currently broadcasting under her real name, Cindy Scott, in syndication.
Mike "Smitty" Smith, midday and afternoon drive host (ca. 2000–2009). Retired from broadcasting in 2016; later served four years as Mayor of Salamanca, New York.
Jesse Garon, evening radio personality (1998–2010). Currently the Afternoon Personality & Assistant Music Director on "Triple M" WMMM-FM and Evening Personality and Assistant Program Director & Music Director on Classic Hits 94.9 WOLX, both in Madison WI.

Third generation
Tim McKeever, afternoon drive host. Continues to DJ and Emcee nationally. He is also an HR professional with Kaleida Health. 
Marian Carter, fill-in and weekend host.
Bethany, co-host of the Morning Pigpen and mid-day host. Currently the morning show co-host at Mix 106.5 in Baltimore
Jasmine Clark, host of the mid-day show. Currently out of the radio industry
Justin Case, afternoon drive host. status currently unknown.
Brad Majors, afternoon drive host. currently at another station

Audience
WPIG's 92,000 watts of power allows the station to boom its signal through most of the western Southern Tier, stretching from Jamestown to Springville over most of Allegany County, and into much of McKean County, Pennsylvania. Its tower is located on the cluster of mountains south of Olean that includes Mount Hermanns and Hartzfelt Mountain, shared with public radio station WOLN.

The station regularly registers by far the top Arbitron ratings in the Olean market. Prior to 2009, the station ranked over a 20 share; the most recent ratings, from spring 2021, show the station having dropped to a 15.7 share due to increased competition.

Other uses
 An entirely fictional "WPIG" radio station made several appearances on the CBS sitcom WKRP in Cincinnati, where it was the hated cross-town rival of the eponymous station. The punchline was that the air staff at WPIG Cincinnati was "a bunch of swine." This usage predates the current WPIG's usage of the call sign.
 A different fictional "WPIG" − WPIG Aurora − appeared in the 1993 motion picture Wayne's World 2. The station featured two memorable characters in the form of "Handsome Dan" and "Mr. Scream," portrayed by Harry Shearer and Ted McGinley, respectively. (Incidentally, the real WPIG, which had begun broadcasting its current format by this time, and the fictional WPIG Aurora both broadcast on 95.7 MHz, a departure from the usual practice of using nonstandard frequencies for fiction.)
 See also KPIG.

References

External links
WPIG Official Web site
Official Facebook page

PIG
Country radio stations in the United States
Radio stations established in 1989